De Witte is a Belgian film of 1934 in black and white, directed by Jan Vanderheyden. It is an adaptation of the hononymous book by Ernest Claes.

De Witte was the first Flemish film production with sound and at the same time it was also very successful. Weeks after the première in Antwerp's Cinema Colosseum the public kept coming to the picture.

Plot
The story describes the boyishnesses of Louis Verheyden, a white-haired rascal (usually nicknamed "de witte", meaning "the white one") in Zichem, a village at the countryside; in the film everything happens from the child's perspective. Edith Kiel added a love story to the original storyline made by Ernest Claes, something the original author did not like. Another adaptation with which the Church instead had difficulties was the minimalized role of the village priest. The main role was interpreted by Jef Bruyninckx.

Remake
In 1980, a new version came out, directed by Robbe De Hert and with the Dutch title De Witte van Sichem. The English name of the movie is Whitey.

References

External links 

1930s Dutch-language films
1934 films
Belgian black-and-white films
Films set in Belgium
Films based on works by Ernest Claes
Films set in the 1900s
Child characters in film
Belgian comedy films
1934 comedy films
Dutch-language Belgian films